The 5th Jharkhand Legislative Assembly was constituted after the 2019 Jharkhand Legislative Assembly election. It is the unicameral state legislature of Jharkhand.

Members of Legislative Assembly

See also 
List of Chief Ministers of Jharkhand
List of constituencies of the Jharkhand Legislative Assembly
List of deputy chief ministers of Jharkhand
List of speakers of the Jharkhand Legislative Assembly
List of leaders of the opposition in the Jharkhand Legislative Assembly

References 

5th
2019 establishments in Jharkhand
2019